Daniel Kox (born 4 February 1952, Ottignies) is a Belgian cartoonist and comics artist, best known for his comics series Agent 212.

Biography
Early in his career, Kox worked as an assistant for Dino Attanasio.

In 1970 began publishing Vladimir et Firmin (Vladimir and Firmin), a series of one-page strips about a forest ranger and a poacher which appeared in the Belgian comics monthly magazine Samedi-Jeunesse and in 1974, started working with Spirou magazine. In 1975, Kox and writer Raoul Cauvin created Agent 212, a humorous about a somewhat gaffe-prone policeman. This very successful series remains Kox' best known work and thirty volumes have been published by Dupuis since 1981.

References

1952 births
Living people
People from Ottignies-Louvain-la-Neuve
Belgian cartoonists
Belgian comics artists
Belgian humorists